The 1896 United States presidential election in North Dakota took place on November 3, 1896. All contemporary 45 states were part of the 1896 United States presidential election. Voters chose three electors to the Electoral College, which selected the president and vice president.

Although the state had been carried by a fusion ticket under the “Populist” label in 1892, unlike the other Mountain and Plains states, North Dakota was largely Catholic or Lutheran and opposed Populist and Democratic nominee William Jennings Bryan’s evangelistic Protestantism. In spite of the fact that this predominantly wheat-growing state was severely hit by drought, high interest rates and problems of poor transportation, hostility to Bryan’s fundamentalism amongst the Russian-Germans of the southern part of the state was intense, while the Catholic Church under the influence of John Ireland also condemned Bryan’s free silver policy at the same time as Bryan toured North Dakota in October. There was also fear that if Bryan were elected the nation would split as severely as it had in 1861 after the election of Abraham Lincoln, and Archbishop Ireland pointed out that Bryan’s election might create class war.

For these reasons, Bryan was able to carry only the rural Scandinavian-American counties in the Red River Valley and the north of the state adjacent to Minnesota and Canada. In the predominantly German remainder of the state, Republican nominees, former Ohio Governor William McKinley and his running mate Garret Hobart of New Jersey established a Republican dominance of the state’s presidential politics that would prove permanent except during the Prohibition and New Deal era.

McKinley won North Dakota by a margin of 11.92 percentage points, becoming the first Republican presidential candidate to win the state. He repeated this much more decisively four years later. Bryan would also later lose the state to William Howard Taft in 1908. Bryan would be the only Democrat to carry any of North Dakota’s counties until Woodrow Wilson in 1912 and the only one to obtain a majority in a North Dakota county until Wilson in 1916. This is the only election ever where North Dakota and Kansas didn't choose the same candidate.

Results

Results by county

See also
 United States presidential elections in North Dakota

Notes

References

North Dakota
1896
1896 North Dakota elections